Paula Vaccaro is a British-Italian film producer, scriptwriter and journalist.

Biography
Paula Vaccaro grew up in Argentina and has lived and worked in Spain, and, since 2000, the UK. As a producer she has worked in films involving international filmmakers such as Emir Kusturica, Guillermo Arriaga, Sara Driver, Jim Jarmusch, Oliver Stone, Sally Potter, Amos Gitai, Aaron Brookner, Edoardo De Angelis and Victoria Solano. She has produced documentaries and fiction films as well as TV documentaries and music videos. Before becoming a film producer, she was a journalist in her native Argentina.

Filmography
As Producer
 Sumercé, directed by Victoria Solano, 2019
 On the Milky Road, directed by Emir Kusturica, 2016
 Uncle Howard, directed by Aaron Brookner, 2016
 Words with Gods, segment Our Life directed by Emir Kusturica, 2014
 Burroughs: the Movie, directed by Howard Brookner, 2014 remaster
 The Silver Goat, directed by Aaron Brookner, 2012

As Executive Producer
 Ginger & Rosa, directed by Sally Potter, 2012
 Mozzarella Stories, directed by Edoardo De Angelis, 2011

As Head of Production
 Maradona by Kusturica, directed by Emir Kusturica, 2008

References

External links
 
 Paula Vaccaro at Mubi
 Pinball London website

Living people
Argentine people of Italian descent
Argentine film producers
Argentine women film producers
Argentine journalists
Argentine women journalists
1973 births
Chevening Scholars